"Only One" is the fourth overall single and second British single released by Australian singer Peter Andre from his second studio album, Natural. The single was released in the United Kingdom on 4 March 1996, as an alternative to the Australasian-only "Get Down on It", via Mushroom Records UK.

The song debuted and peaked at  16 on the UK Singles Chart the same month, and in July, it debuted at its peak of No. 5 in New Zealand, becoming Andre's third consecutive top-five hit in that country. It has received a gold certification in New Zealand for selling over 5,000 copies.

Track listings

Australian CD single
 "Only One"
 "Gonna Get to You" (R'n'B edit)
 "Only One" (Rapino Brothers dub mix)
 "Only One" (Rapino Brothers club mix)

German maxi-CD single
 "Only One"
 "Only One" (Rapino Brothers club mix)
 "Gonna Get to You"

UK cassette single
 "Only One"
 "Gimme Little Sign"

UK CD1
 "Only One"
 "Only One" (Rapino Brothers club mix)
 "Gonna Get to You" – 4:34
 Exclusive interview (part 1)

UK CD2
 "Only One"
 "Only One" (Rapino Brothers dub mix)
 "Let's Get It On"
 Exclusive interview (part 2)

Charts

Certifications

Release history

References

1994 songs
1996 singles
Mushroom Records singles
Peter Andre songs
Songs written by Peter Andre